Eutrichillus comus is a species of longhorn beetles of the subfamily Lamiinae. It was described by Bates in 1881, and is known from western Mexico, Honduras, and El Salvador.

References

Beetles described in 1881
Acanthocinini